Ptilinopinae is a subfamily of birds from the family Columbidae.

Genera
Drepanoptila Bonaparte, 1855
Ducula Hodgson, 1836
Gymnophaps Salvadori, 1874
Hemiphaga Bonaparte, 1854
Lopholaimus Gould, 1841
Ptilinopus Swainson, 1825
†Rupephaps Worthy et al., 2009
†Tongoenas Steadman and Takano, 2020

Gallery of genera

References

 
Bird subfamilies